Baiju is an Indian film Producer/Actor, who has worked predominantly in Malayalam movie industry. Baiju has worked in popular movies like Aaraattu, Yuvam. Baiju's previous film to hit the theatres was Aaraattu in the year 2022.

Filmography

Director 
2013 - KQ

Producer 
2001 - Sundara Purushan

References

External links
 

Living people
Male actors in Malayalam cinema
Indian male film actors
Malayalam film producers
1971 births